Castilleja rubida, commonly called the purple alpine paintbrush or Wallowa alpine paintbrush, is a species of Indian Paintbrush.

Description 
This is a short perennial species growing only 5–15 cm tall. Leaves are a dark green or purple, and the bracts are usually purple, burgundy, and lavender, though it is rarely pink or yellowish.

Range 
This species is endemic to limestone peaks in the Eagle Cap Wilderness, Oregon, between 2,200-3,000 m (7,217–9842 ft).

Habitat 
Rocky slopes, ledges, gravelly flats and alpine ridges.

Phenology 
Flowers bloom in July and August.

Conservation 
Currently treated as a G2 (Imperiled) on NatureServe, due to restricted range and climate change.

References 

rubida

Orobanchaceae
Flora of Oregon
Endemic flora of Oregon
Endemic flora of the United States
Wallowa County, Oregon